The Process is a 2014 album recorded by a supergroup of musicians that consists of Red Hot Chili Peppers drummer Chad Smith, bassist/producer Bill Laswell and jazz pianist Jonathan Batiste. The album was recorded in 2013 as a musical score for a film that had yet to be written and never ended up being made. The album also features guest appearances by Tunde Adebimpe of TV on the Radio, Wu-Tang affiliate Killah Priest, avant-garde jazz musician Peter Apfelbaum, and avant-garde jazz trumpeter Toshinori Kondo, among others.

Track listing

 "B1" 
 "Drop Away" 
 "Timeline" 
 "Haunted" 
 "B2" 
 "Turn on the Light/Ascent" 
 "Black Arc" 
 "Spiral"
 "B3"
 "Time Falls"
 "The Drift"

Personnel
Taken from information on the 
Musicians
 Jon Batiste – piano, electric piano, Hammond organ, electronic keyboards, harmonaboard, percussion
 Chad Smith – drums, percussion
 Bill Laswell – basses, guitar, electronics
Additional Personnel
 Tunde Adebimpe – vocals on "Drop Away"
 Killah Priest – vocals on "Turn on the Light/Ascent"
 Garrison Hawk – vocals on "Turn on the Light/Ascent"
 Toshinoro Kondo – trumpet on "Haunted"
 Peter Apfelbaum – flute & tenor saxophone on 6 & soprano saxophone on "The Drift"
 Dominic James – guitar on "Black Arc" and "The Drift"

References

External links 

The Process - Discogs Entry
The Process on Bandcamp

2014 albums
Collaborative albums
Bill Laswell albums
Albums produced by Bill Laswell
Jon Batiste albums